Gisela Baur-Nütten, complete name Gisela Maria Pauline Coelestine Nütten, (12 May 1886 – 10 September 1981) was a German painter and graphic designer of the Düsseldorf school of painting.

Life 
Born in Düsseldorf, Baur-Nütten grew up as the daughter of the Royal Prussian officer Karl (Charles) Eugen Maria Heinrich Nütten (b. 1847 in Saarlouis) and his wife, the writer Anna Nütten, née Startz (b. 1861 in Aachen), daughter of the Kommerzienrat Conrad Alexander Startz, in Düsseldorf and from 1895 in Kleve, where her father, then a retired colonel. In the 1900s, she briefly took private lessons with the painter Carl Murdfield. Around 1906,  she married Albert Baur, a history and landscape painter of the Düsseldorf school. On 3 June 1909, their daughter Ruth was born in Düsseldorf, who later made a name for herself as a ballet mistress in Kleve under her married name "Countess von Bullion".

In the 1920s, she resumed her "innate profession" as a painter and created landscapes, architectural views, sacred paintings (such as Stations of the Cross) and portraits. She also worked as a wood and linocutter and as a dancer. In Kleve, where she had settled after the death of her parents and with the exception of the years 1940 to 1943, when she stayed in Rome and Anticoli Corrado, lived and worked, however, she was perceived less as an artist than as a dazzling personality with a resolute demeanour, which earned her the nickname "Generalin" there.

Baur-Nütten died in Kleve at the age of 95.

References

Further reading 
 : Aachener Wappen und Genealogien. Aachen 1907, vol. 2, .
 : Aus dem Leben einer niederrheinischen Kirchenmalerin. In Das Bild, Jahrgang 4, fascicule 9 (September 1934), pp. 289 f. (with auto-portrait by Gisela Baur-Nütten).
 Wilhelm Diedenhofen: Skizzen und Notizen aus dem Taschenbüchlein einer jungen Künstlerin. In Rund um den Schwanenturm. Jahrgang 30 (2011), fascicule 35,  (with illustrations).

External links 
 Gisela Baur-Nütten, im Portal (Netherlands Institute for Art History)
 Gisela Maria Nütten, in Portal familienbuch-euregio.eu

20th-century German painters
German women painters
20th-century German women artists
German landscape painters
German history painters
German portrait painters
Graphic designers
1886 births
1981 deaths